Arnold Rüütel (born 10 May 1928) is an Estonian politician. He was the third President of Estonia from 8 October 2001 to 9 October 2006. Rüütel was the second president of the country after the end of the 1944–1991 Soviet occupation, and the restoration of the independent Republic of Estonia on 20 August 1991.

Biography
Rüütel was born in Pahavalla village in Laimjala Parish, Saaremaa, Estonia. His parents were Feodor Rüütel (1900−1965) and Juulia Rüütel (1905−1990). He graduated from the Agricultural College in Jäneda in 1949.

He worked as a senior agronomist in Saaremaa (1949−1950) and then as a teacher at the Tartu School of Agricultural Mechanization (1955−1957). In between those two jobs, he served his term in the Soviet Army. In 1957, he was appointed as the director of the experimental farm of the Research Institute of Veterinary Medicine and Animal Husbandry, and in 1963 he was appointed director of the Tartu Reference State Farm, remaining in this position until 1969. He graduated from the Estonian Academy of Agriculture in 1964. From 1969 to 1977, Rüütel was rector of the Estonian Academy of Agriculture. He served as the last chairman of the Presidium of the Supreme Soviet of the Estonian SSR (thus he was also one of the 15 deputy chairmen of the Supreme Soviet of the USSR) from 8 April 1983 to 29 March 1990.

On 29 March 1990 he was elected Chairman of the Supreme Council (head of parliament), after the first free elections in the then Soviet-occupied Estonia. He served in that position when Estonia restored full independence on 20 August 1991, and continued in office until 6 October 1992. In the independent Estonia, Rüütel was also a member of the Constitutional Assembly from 1991 to 1992, which drafted the new Constitution of the Republic of Estonia. He stood as a candidate in the first presidential election in 1992. In the first round, Rüütel received the best result, 43% of popular vote, but still short of required 50% majority. The second round was held in the parliament (Riigikogu), and there Rüütel lost to the presidential elections to Lennart Meri.

In 1991, Rüütel took his Doctorate in agriculture. He served as Chairman of the People's Union of Estonia from 1994 to 2000, and was elected as a member of parliament (Riigikogu), in 1995, where he acted as vice-chairman until 1997. He ran for president in the 1996 election (this time an indirect election with no popular vote) and lost to Meri once again.

Presidency

Rüütel was elected president by an electoral college on 21 September 2001, defeating Toomas Savi in the final round by votes of 186 to 155. Rüütel was inaugurated as President of the Republic on 8 October 2001. Rüütel announced in his election manifesto that his principal aims would be to reduce the negative effects that Estonia's speedy economic changes had had on a large number of people, and to seek greater solidarity within the society.

The end of Rüütel's term was overshadowed by several controversies. At the Independence Day military parade on 24 February 2005, Rüütel repeatedly congratulated soldiers on 'Victory day' (Estonian Victory Day is on June 23), which caused speculation about the then 77-year-old president's mental health. In January 2006, Estonian Television reported that Rüütel's underage granddaughters had organized a party in the presidential palace and drunk alcohol. Later that year, the newspaper Eesti Ekspress published archived documents suggesting that Rüütel as a top functionary of the Estonian SSR was involved in the persecution of scientist Johannes Hint (later sentenced to jail in a show trial) by the KGB. Rüütel himself commented that he had tried to defend Hint.

As Rüütel's term was due to end in October 2006, he announced on 7 June 2006 that he would be a candidate for re-election, thus ending speculation as to his candidacy. In late August, the parliament failed to elect a President. The election of Ene Ergma and Toomas Hendrik Ilves by the parliament was blocked by Rüütel's supporters, who did not take out ballots. The electoral college met to vote for a president on September 23. The latest opinion polls (September 2006) had suggested that Rüütel's popular support was around 31 per cent (Ilves' support was 51%); Rüütel was more popular amongst the elderly and the Russian-speaking minority. In the electoral college, Rüütel received 162 votes against 174 for Ilves. Rüütel congratulated the winner and offered his assistance. Rüütel's presidency therefore expired at the end of his term, and Ilves took office on 9 October 2006.

Later activities
Rüütel voiced support for Mart Helme of the Conservative People's Party of Estonia in the 2016 Estonian presidential election. Since leaving office, he has continued to meet with his former counterparts, including Kazakh president Nursultan Nazarbayev and Moldovan president Petru Lucinschi.

Awards
 : Order of the Badge of Honour (1964)
 : Order of Lenin (1971)
 : Order of Friendship of Peoples (1981)
 : Collar of the Order of the Cross of Terra Mariana (2001)
 : Collar of the Order of the National Coat of Arms (2008)
 : Grand Cross of the Order of the White Rose with collar (2001)
 : Grand Cross of the Order of St. Olav (2002)
 : Great Cross of the Order of the White Eagle
 : Grand Collar of the Order of Prince Henry (2003) 
 : Great Cross of the Order of Adolphe of Nassau (2003)
 : Knight Grand Cross of the Order of the Falcon (2004)
 : Grand Cross (or 1st Class) of the Order of the White Double Cross (2005)
 : Grand Collar of the Order of Saint James of the Sword (2006)
 : Knight Grand Cross with Grand Cordon of the Order of Merit of the Italian Republic
 : Commander Grand Cross with Chain of the Order of Three Stars
 : Grand Cross with Golden Chain of the Order of Vytautas the Great (30 September 2004)
 : Gusi Peace Prize for Statesmanship (27 November 2013)

Gallery

Notes

References

External links

 About Arnold Rüütel in The President of the Republic of Estonia homepage
 Biography of Arnold Rüütel

1928 births
Living people
People from Saaremaa Parish
People's Union of Estonia politicians
Conservative People's Party of Estonia politicians
Presidents of Estonia
Members of the Riigikogu, 1995–1999
Members of the Riigikogu, 1999–2003
Members of the Central Committee of the Communist Party of Estonia
Heads of state of the Estonian Soviet Socialist Republic
Members of the Supreme Soviet of the Estonian Soviet Socialist Republic
Eleventh convocation members of the Soviet of Nationalities
People of the Singing Revolution
Resigned Communist Party of the Soviet Union members
Voters of the Estonian restoration of Independence
Estonian University of Life Sciences alumni
Academic staff of the Estonian University of Life Sciences

Recipients of the Collar of the Order of the Cross of Terra Mariana

Grand Collars of the Order of Prince Henry
Grand Collars of the Order of Saint James of the Sword
Knights Grand Cross with Collar of the Order of Merit of the Italian Republic
Knights Grand Cross of the Order of the Falcon
Grand Crosses with Golden Chain of the Order of Vytautas the Great
Recipients of the Order of the Star of Romania
Recipients of the Order of Lenin
Recipients of the Order of Friendship of Peoples
Recipients of the Order of the White Eagle (Poland)